Saunaküla Landscape Conservation Area is a nature park which is located in Rapla County, Estonia.

The area of the nature park is 26 ha.

The protected area was founded in 1973 to protect Hageri-Sutlema coastal formations.

References

Nature reserves in Estonia
Geography of Rapla County